An unofficial order of precedence in Northern Ireland, according to Burke's Peerage, 106th Edition, this is not officially authorised by or published with authority (cum privilegio) from either Buckingham Palace (the Royal Household) or the College of Arms, or the Home Office, the Ministry of Justice or the Northern Ireland Office (NIO) of Her Majesty's Government in the United Kingdom, or the Northern Ireland Assembly, or the Northern Ireland Executive.

History
The first official "Scale of Local Precedence for Northern Ireland" was made by royal warrant of George V on 30 January 1923 transmitted James Hamilton, 3rd Duke of Abercorn, who was Governor of Northern Ireland. The Governor ranked next in the scale after the Sovereign. The 1923 scale replaced the order of precedence in Ireland consequent on the partition of Ireland and abolition of the Lord Lieutenant of Ireland, whose functions the Governor carried out in Northern Ireland. The 1923 scale was drawn up by Nevile Wilkinson, the Ulster King of Arms, who despite partition was based in Dublin and  retained all-island jurisdiction until 1943. The scale was replaced on 2 July 1924, and modified subsequently, as for example in 1948 to include the minister and permanent secretary of the Ministry of Health and Local Government (created in 1944) and the Air Officer Commanding, Northern Ireland. The Northern Ireland Constitution Act 1973 abolished many offices in the scale and added many new ones, but  no updated scale was officially made.

Gentlemen
The Sovereign (King Charles III)
Male members of the Royal Family, as set out in Orders of precedence in the United Kingdom/Royal family (men)
Lord Lieutenants (see list here) (during term of office and within bounds of counties and cities)
High sheriffs of counties (see list here) (during term of office and within bounds of counties)
The Church of Ireland and Roman Catholic archbishops of Ireland, the Moderator of the Presbyterian Church in Ireland and the President Of the Methodist Church in Ireland, according to the seniority of their consecration or election
Archbishop of Armagh (Roman Catholic) (Eamon Martin)
Archbishop of Dublin (Roman Catholic) (Dermot Farrell)
Archbishop of Dublin (Church of Ireland) (Michael Jackson)
Archbishop of Armagh (Church of Ireland) (John McDowell)
Moderator of the General Assembly of the Presbyterian Church in Ireland (John Kirkpatrick)
The Lord Mayor of Belfast and the mayors of boroughs in Northern Ireland, but as in England the mayors take precedence next to the Royal Family if within their city halls' precincts.
The Recorders of boroughs in Northern Ireland during civic functions in their boroughs
High sheriffs of Belfast and Derry during civic functions in their boroughs
The Lord High Steward (office only in existence for coronations)
The Lord High Chancellor (Dominic Raab MP)
The Prime Minister (Rishi Sunak MP)
Commonwealth Prime Ministers, while visiting the UK, in order of appointment
The Lord High Treasurer (currently in commission)
Speaker of the House of Commons (Sir Lindsay Hoyle MP)
The Lord Speaker (The Baron McFall of Alcluith)
 The President of the Supreme Court of the United Kingdom (Lord Reed)
 The Lord Privy Seal (The Baron True)
Ambassadors of foreign countries and High Commissioners of Commonwealth countries according to date of arrival
The Lord Great Chamberlain (The 7th Baron Carrington)
The Lord High Constable (office only in existence coronations)
The Earl Marshal (The 18th Duke of Norfolk)
The Lord High Admiral (office vacant since the death of Prince Philip, Duke of Edinburgh)
The Lord Steward of the Household (The 7th Earl of Rosslyn)
The Lord Chamberlain of the Household (The Lord Parker of Minsmere)
The Master of the Horse (The 7th Baron de Mauley)
Dukes
Alexander, Earl of Ulster, eldest son of The Duke of Gloucester
George, Earl of St Andrews, eldest son of The Duke of Kent
Ministers, envoys, and other very important visitors from foreign countries
Marquesses
Eldest sons of dukes (see list)
Earls
Younger sons of dukes of Blood Royal (Lord Nicholas Windsor)
Eldest sons of marquesses
Younger sons of dukes
Viscounts
Eldest sons of earls
Lord Frederick Windsor
Younger sons of marquesses
The Church of Ireland and Roman Catholic Bishops, according to seniority of consecration
Secretaries of State, if of the degree of a baron (none)
Barons and Lords of Parliament
The Lord Chief Justice of Northern Ireland (Held by a woman)
Vice-Chamberlain of the Household (Michael Tomlinson MP)
Secretaries of State under the degree of baron
 The Secretary of State for Justice (Dominic Raab)
 The Secretary of State for Foreign, Commonwealth and Development Affairs (James Cleverly MP)
 The Secretary of State for Defence (Ben Wallace MP)
 The Secretary of State for Levelling Up, Housing and Communities (Michael Gove MP)
 The Secretary of State for Business, Energy and Industrial Strategy (Grant Shapps MP)
 The Secretary of State for Health and Social Care (Steve Barclay MP)
 The Secretary of State for Work and Pensions (Mel Stride MP)
 The Secretary of State for Transport (Mark Harper MP)
 The Secretary of State for Northern Ireland (Chris Heaton-Harris MP)
 The Secretary of State for Scotland (Alister Jack MP)
 The Secretary of State for Wales (David TC Davies MP)
The Secretaries of State for the Home Department; for International Trade; for Digital, Culture, Media and Sport; for Education; and for Environment, Food and Rural Affairs are women
Eldest sons of viscounts
Younger sons of earls
Eldest sons of barons
Knights of the Garter
Knights of the Thistle
Knights of St Patrick (none, order dormant)
Privy Counsellors
Lords Justices of Appeal of Northern Ireland
Judges of the High Court of Northern Ireland
Younger sons of viscounts
Younger sons of barons
Baronets
Knights Grand Cross of the Order of the Bath
Knights Grand Commanders of the Order of the Star of India (none, order dormant)
Knights Grand Cross of the Order of St Michael and St George
Knights Grand Commander of the Order of the Indian Empire (none, order dormant)
Knights Grand Cross of the Royal Victorian Order
Knights Grand Cross of the Order of the British Empire
Knights Commanders of the Order of the Bath
Knights Commanders of the Order of the Star of India (none, order dormant)
Knights Commanders of the Order of St Michael and St George
Knights Commanders of the Order of the Indian Empire (none, order dormant)
Knights Commanders of the Royal Victorian Order
Knights Commanders of the Order of the British Empire
Knights Bachelor
County Court Judges in Northern Ireland and Recorders of Boroughs
Companions of the Order of the Bath
Companions of the Order of the Star of India (none, order dormant)
Companions of the Order of St Michael and St George
Companions of the Order of the Indian Empire (none, order dormant)
Commanders of the Royal Victorian Order
Commanders of the Order of the British Empire
Companions of the Distinguished Service Order
Lieutenants of the Royal Victorian Order
Officers of the Order of the British Empire
Companions of the Imperial Service Order
Eldest sons of younger sons of peers
Eldest sons of baronets
Eldest sons of Knights of the Garter
Eldest sons of Knights of the Thistle
Eldest sons of Knights of St Patrick
Eldest sons of Knights Grand Cross of the Order of the Bath
Eldest sons of Knights Grand Commander of the Star of India
Eldest sons of Knights Grand Cross of the Order of St Michael and St George
Eldest sons of Knights Grand Commander of the Order of the Indian Empire
Eldest sons of Knights Grand Cross of the Royal Victorian Order
Eldest sons of Knights Grand Cross of the Order of the British Empire
Eldest sons of Knights Commander of the Order of the Bath
Eldest sons of Knights Commander of the Order of the Star of India
Eldest sons of Knights Commander of the Order of St Michael and St George
Eldest sons of Knights Commander of the Order of the Indian Empire
Eldest sons of Knights Commander of the Royal Victorian Order
Eldest sons of Knights Commander of the Order of the British Empire
Members of the Royal Victorian Order
Members of the Order of the British Empire
Younger sons of baronets
Younger sons of Knights of the Garter
Younger sons of Knights of the Thistle
Younger sons of Knights of St Patrick
Younger sons of Knights Grand Cross of the Order of the Bath
Younger sons of Knights Grand Commander of the Star of India
Younger sons of Knights Grand Cross of the Order of St Michael and St George
Younger sons of Knights Grand Commander of the Order of the Indian Empire
Younger sons of Knights Grand Cross of the Royal Victorian Order
Younger sons of Knights Grand Cross of the Order of the British Empire
Younger sons of Knights Commander of the Order of the Bath
Younger sons of Knights Commander of the Order of the Star of India
Younger sons of Knights Commander of the Order of St Michael and St George
Younger sons of Knights Commander of the Order of the Indian Empire
Younger sons of Knights Commander of the Royal Victorian Order
Younger sons of Knights Commander of the Order of the British Empire
The Head of the Northern Ireland Civil Service (Malcolm McKibbin)
The Permanent Secretary to the Department of Finance and Personnel (Stephen Peover)
The Permanent Secretary to the Department of Education (Paul Sweeney)
The Permanent Secretary to the Department of Agriculture and Rural Development (Gerry Lavery)
The Permanent Secretary to the Department of the Environment (Leo O'Reilly)
The Permanent Secretary to the Department of Enterprise, Trade and Investment (David Sterling)
The Permanent Secretary to the Department of Health, Social Services and Public Safety (Andrew McCormick)
The Permanent Secretary to the Department of Culture, Arts and Leisure (Rosalie Flanagan)
The Permanent Secretary to the Department for Employment and Learning (Alan Shannon)
The Permanent Secretary to the Department of Regional Development (David Orr)
The Permanent Secretary to the Department of Social Development (William Haire)
The Clerk of the Northern Ireland Assembly (Arthur Moir)
The Comptroller and Auditor General for Northern Ireland (Kieran Donnelly)
The Examiner of Statutory Rules (Gordon Nabney)
The Crown Solicitor for Northern Ireland (O. G. Paulin)
King's Counsel of Northern Ireland
The Chief Constable of the Police Service of Northern Ireland (Simon Byrne)

Ladies
Female members of the Royal Family, as set out in Orders of precedence in the United Kingdom/Royal family (women)
Lord President of the Council (Penny Mordaunt MP)
Commonwealth Prime Ministers, while visiting the UK, in order of appointment
Ambassadors of foreign countries and High Commissioners of Commonwealth countries according to date of arrival
Duchesses
Claire Windsor, Countess of Ulster, wife of Earl of Ulster
Sylvana Tomaselli, wife of Earl of St Andrews
Lady Davina Windsor, elder daughter of the Duke of Gloucester
Lady Rose Gilman, younger daughter of the Duke of Gloucester
Lady Helen Taylor, only daughter of the Duke of Kent
Marchionesses
Wives of duke's eldest sons
Daughters of dukes not married to peers
Countesses
Wives of marquesses' eldest sons
Lady Gabriella Kingston
Marquesses' daughters not married to peers
Wives of dukes' younger sons
Viscountesses
Wives of eldest sons of earls or of countesses in their own right
Earls' daughters not married to peers
Sophie Winkleman, wife of Lord Frederick Windsor
Wives of marquesses' younger sons
Treasurer of the Household (Kelly Tolhurst MP)
Comptroller of the Household (Rebecca Harris MP)
Secretaries of State, if of the degree of a baroness (none)
Baronesses, wives of Lords of Parliament, and female holders of Lordships of Parliament
Secretaries of State below the degree of baroness
 The Secretary of State for International Trade (Kemi Badenoch MP)
 The Secretary of State for Education (Gillian Keegan MP)
 The Secretary of State for Environment, Food and Rural Affairs (Therese Coffey MP)
 The Secretary of State for Digital, Culture, Media and Sport (Michelle Donelan MP)
 The Secretary of State for the Home Department (Suella Braverman MP)
Wives of viscounts' eldest sons
Viscounts' daughters not married to peers
Wives of younger sons of earls or of countesses in their own right
Wives of eldest sons of barons or baronesses
Daughters of barons or baronesses
Ladies of the Garter
Anne, Princess Royal
Princess Alexandra, the Hon Lady Ogilvy
Ladies of the Thistle
Anne, Princess Royal
Wives of Knights of the Garter
all rank higher, except:
June Hillary
Jennifer Acland
Norma Major
Cherie Blair
Wives of Knights of the Thistle
all rank higher, except:
Poppy Anderson
Privy Counsellors
Lords Justices of Appeal
High Court Judges
Wives of viscounts' younger sons
Wives of younger sons of barons or baronesses
Wives of baronets
Dames Grand Cross of the Order of the Bath
Dames Grand Cross of the Order of St Michael and St George
Dames Grand Cross of the Royal Victorian Order
Dames Grand Cross of the Order of the British Empire
Wives of Knights Grand Cross of the Order of the Bath
Wives of Knights Grand Commander of the Order of the Star of India
Wives of Knights Grand Cross of the Order of St Michael and St George
Wives of Knights Grand Commander of the Order of the Indian Empire
Wives of Knights Grand Cross of the Royal Victorian Order
Wives of Knights Grand Cross of the Order of the British Empire
Dames Commander of the Order of the Bath
Dames Commander of the Order of St Michael and St George
Dames Commander of the Royal Victorian Order
Dames Commandes of the Order of the British Empire
County Court Judges in Northern Ireland and Recorders of Boroughs
Wives of Knights Commander of the Order of the Bath
Wives of Knights Commander of the Order of the Star of India
Wives of Knights Commander of the Order of St Michael and St George
Wives of Knights Commander of the Order of the Indian Empire
Wives of Knights Commander of the Royal Victorian Order
Wives of Knights Commander of the Order of the British Empire
Wives of Knights Bachelor
Companions of the Order of the Bath
Companions of the Order of St Michael and St George
Commanders of the Royal Victorian Order
Commanders of the Order of the British Empire
Wives of Companions of the Order of the Bath
Wives of Companions of the Order of the Star of India
Wives of Companions of the Order of St Michael and St George
Wives of Companions of the Order of the Indian Empire
Wives of Commanders of the Royal Victorian Order
Wives of Commanders of the Order of the British Empire
Wives of Companions of the Distinguished Service Order
Lieutenants of the Royal Victorian Order
Officers of the Order of the British Empire
Wives of Lieutenants of the Royal Victorian Order
Wives of Officers of the Order of the British Empire
Companions of the Imperial Service Order
Wives of Companions of the Imperial Service Order
Wives of the eldest sons of sons of peers or peeresses
Daughters of sons of peers or peeresses
Wives of the eldest sons of baronets
Daughters of baronets
Wives of eldest sons of Knights of the Garter
Wives of eldest sons of Knights of the Thistle
Wives of eldest sons of Knights of St Patrick
Wives of eldest sons of Knights Grand Cross of the Order of the Bath
Wives of eldest sons of Knights Grand Commander of the Star of India
Wives of eldest sons of Knights Grand Cross of the Order of St Michael and St George
Wives of eldest sons of Knights Grand Commander of the Order of the Indian Empire
Wives of eldest sons of Knights Grand Cross of the Royal Victorian Order
Wives of eldest sons of Knights Grand Cross of the Order of the British Empire
Wives of eldest sons of Knights Commander of the Order of the Bath
Wives of eldest sons of Knights Commander of the Order of the Star of India
Wives of eldest sons of Knights Commander of the Order of St Michael and St George
Wives of eldest sons of Knights Commander of the Order of the Indian Empire
Wives of eldest sons of Knights Commander of the Royal Victorian Order
Wives of eldest sons of Knights Commander of the Order of the British Empire
Daughters of Knights of the Garter
Daughters of Knights of the Thistle
Daughters of Knights of St Patrick
Daughters of Knights Grand Cross of the Order of the Bath
Daughters of Knights Grand Commander of the Star of India
Daughters of Knights Grand Cross of the Order of St Michael and St George
Daughters of Knights Grand Commander of the Order of the Indian Empire
Daughters of Knights Grand Cross of the Royal Victorian Order
Daughters of Knights Grand Cross of the Order of the British Empire
Daughters of Knights Commander of the Order of the Bath
Daughters of Knights Commander of the Order of the Star of India
Daughters of Knights Commander of the Order of St Michael and St George
Daughters of Knights Commander of the Order of the Indian Empire
Daughters of Knights Commander of the Royal Victorian Order
Daughters of Knights Commander of the Order of the British Empire
Members of the Royal Victorian Order
Members of the Order of the British Empire
Wives of Members of the Royal Victorian Order
Wives of Members of the Order of the British Empire
Wives of younger sons of baronets
Wives of younger sons of Knights of the Garter
Wives of younger sons of Knights of the Thistle
Wives of younger sons of Knights of St Patrick
Wives of younger sons of Knights Grand Cross of the Order of the Bath
Wives of younger sons of Knights Grand Commander of the Star of India
Wives of younger sons of Knights Grand Cross of the Order of St Michael and St George
Wives of younger sons of Knights Grand Commander of the Order of the Indian Empire
Wives of younger sons of Knights Grand Cross of the Royal Victorian Order
Wives of younger sons of Knights Grand Cross of the Order of the British Empire
Wives of younger sons of Knights Commander of the Order of the Bath
Wives of younger sons of Knights Commander of the Order of the Star of India
Wives of younger sons of Knights Commander of the Order of St Michael and St George
Wives of younger sons of Knights Commander of the Order of the Indian Empire
Wives of younger sons of Knights Commander of the Royal Victorian Order
Wives of younger sons of Knights Commander of the Order of the British Empire
The Permanent Secretary to the Department of Culture, Arts and Leisure (Rosalie Flanagan)

Local precedence
The Lord Lieutenant of the County:
Lord Lieutenant for County Antrim (David McCorkell)
Lord Lieutenant for County Armagh (Nicholas Alexander, 7th Earl of Caledon)
Lord Lieutenant for the County Borough of Belfast (Finnouala Jay-O'Boyle)
Lord Lieutenant for County Down (Gawn William Rowan Hamilton)
Lord Lieutenant for County Fermanagh (Alan Brooke, 3rd Viscount Brookeborough)
Lord Lieutenant for the County Borough of Londonderry (Angela Garvey)
Lord Lieutenant for County Londonderry (Alison Millar)
Lord Lieutenant for County Tyrone (Robert Lowry Scott)
The Lord Mayor:
The Lord Mayor of Belfast (appointed annually)
The (Elected) Mayor
The Deputy Mayor
Councillors
Justices of the Peace
The Town Clerk

Notes

References

Northern Ireland
Politics of Northern Ireland
Society of Northern Ireland